Boneh-ye Sukhteh or Boneh Sukhteh may refer to:
 Boneh Sukhteh, Kerman
 Boneh Sukhteh, Bam, Kerman Province
 Boneh-ye Sukhteh, Khuzestan